Dalal Mesfer Al-Harith (born November 28, 1999) is a Qatari sprinter. She competed at the 2016 Summer Olympics in the women's 400 metres race; her time of 1:07.12 in the heats did not qualify her for the semifinals.

References

1999 births
Living people
Qatari female sprinters
Olympic athletes of Qatar
Athletes (track and field) at the 2016 Summer Olympics
Olympic female sprinters